Phyllonorycter occitanica is a moth of the family Gracillariidae. It is known from Texas, United States.

The larvae feed on Ulmus species, including Ulmus fulva and Ulmus rubra. They mine the leaves of their host plant.

References

occitanica
Moths of North America
Moths described in 1876